Cabri Airport  is located adjacent to Cabri, Saskatchewan, Canada. One plane is located there.

See also
List of airports in Saskatchewan

External links
Page about this airport on COPA's Places to Fly airport directory

References

Registered aerodromes in Saskatchewan